Two total lunar eclipses occurred in 1989: 

 20 February 1989 lunar eclipse
 17 August 1989 lunar eclipse

See also 
 List of 20th-century lunar eclipses
 Lists of lunar eclipses